(born 18 February 1969 in Ogachi, Akita) is a former rugby union footballer who played for Japan. He played as a wing.

Career
His first match for Japan was during a test against Oxford University at Tokyo, on October 1, 1990. He played 1991 Rugby World Cup, where he scored 2 tries against Zimbabwe, at Ravenhill. He was also part of the 1995 Rugby World Cup, playing against Ireland, where he scored 2 tries and 4 conversions, and against New Zealand. His last international cap was against USA, at Osaka, on May 25, 1997.

Club career
He played for Isetan between 1991 and 2000. Later he played for the French side US Colomiers for two seasons. Between 2001 and 2003, he played for Sanyo Electric, the following year, he ended his career for Fukuoka Sanix Bombs. In 1992, he also played for World XV against the All Blacks.

Coach career
In 2004 he coached Yokogawa Musashino Atlastars until 2009, when he coached Meiji University, where he played back in his amateur years. Since 2014, he coaches the rugby sevens club Samurai Seven

Personal life
In 2008, he married the singer and songwriter Ari Ōnishi.

Notes

References

External links

1969 births
Living people
Japanese rugby union players
Japanese rugby union coaches
Rugby union wings
Japan international rugby union players
Saitama Wild Knights players
Munakata Sanix Blues players
Japan international rugby sevens players